Pukaqucha (Quechua puka red, qucha lake, hispanicized spelling Pucacocha) is a lake in Peru, in the Lima Region, Huarochiri Province, Huanza District. It is about 1.00 km long and 0.8 km at its widest point.

References 

Lakes of Peru
Lakes of Lima Region